Saint-Henri is a municipality of 5,611 people, 20 km south of Lévis, in the Bellechasse Regional County Municipality. It is sometimes known as Saint-Henri-de-Lévis, and was historically known as Saint-Henri-de-Lauzon.

It used to belong to the former Desjardins Regional County Municipality, but decided to join Bellechasse in 2000 when the new city of Lévis was created. Saint-Henri felt it did not belong with a mostly urban RCM, and would fit better with Bellechasse, which has a largely rural base. Now, Saint-Henri is the biggest town in this RCM, followed by Saint-Anselme and Sainte-Claire. The Etchemin River crosses the municipality and one hydroelectric dam is found in Saint-Henri. On November 6, 1775, Benedict Arnold is said to have visited the village on his way to attack Quebec City. The largest local business is Olymel, a meat processing factory.

Demographics

Population

References

Municipalities in Quebec
Incorporated places in Chaudière-Appalaches
Canada geography articles needing translation from French Wikipedia